Johnny Hooper (born 13 December 1934) is an Irish sailor. He competed at the 1960 Summer Olympics and the 1964 Summer Olympics.

References

External links
 

1934 births
Living people
Irish male sailors (sport)
Olympic sailors of Ireland
Sailors at the 1960 Summer Olympics – Flying Dutchman
Sailors at the 1964 Summer Olympics – Finn
Sportspeople from Dublin (city)